The  in 1565 was the first recorded naval battle between Europeans (the Portuguese) and the Japanese. A flotilla of samurai under the daimyō Matsura Takanobu attacked two Portuguese trade vessels that had shunned Matsura's port in Hirado and had gone instead to trade at Fukuda (now within Nagasaki), a port belonging to the rival Ōmura Sumitada. The engagement was part of a process of trial and error by the Portuguese traders to find a safe harbour for their carracks in Japan that eventually brought them to Nagasaki.

Background
In 1543, Europeans reached Japan for the first time when a junk belonging to the Chinese wokou pirate lord Wang Zhi carrying Portuguese traders shipwrecked on Tanegashima. The Portuguese introduced the arquebus to the Japanese during this chance encounter, which gave the Japanese, undergoing the bloody Sengoku period at the time, a powerful weapon with which they conducted their internecine wars. The discovery of Japan was attractive to Portuguese merchants and missionaries alike, for it gave the merchants a new market to trade their goods, and the Jesuit missionaries eyed Japan for new converts into Christianity. The warlords of Kyushu vied to get the Portuguese carrack (called the black ship by the Japanese) into their harbours, since the ship also brought considerable wealth to their fiefdoms in addition to the guns.

The Portuguese initially made Hirado their preferred port of call, since it was familiar to their wokou partners, although they also visited the ports of Kagoshima, Yamagawa, Hiji, and Funai from time to time. The Jesuits felt that the carrack should take turns visiting each port of Kyushu so the priests could cover more ground and convert more people, but the merchants had other priorities in mind: the carrack had to land at a harbour that protected their valuable cargo from the wind and weather, and a stable port of call was essential to build a reliable clientele. The daimyō of Hirado, Matsura Takanobu, at first accommodated the missionaries due to their association with the Portuguese traders, but turned hostile once he felt they overdid their evangelization by burning books and destroying Buddhist images. Matsura Takanobu evicted the missionaries from Hirado in 1558, and did not allow them to come back for five years. In 1561, 15 Portuguese were killed in Hirado in a brawl with the Japanese while a captain was also killed in Akune marking the first recorded clashes between Europeans and the Japanese.

Faced with such events, the Portuguese found it prudent to find a safer port to call. Yokoseura (in present-day Saikai, Nagasaki) was found to be a suitable harbour, and the local daimyo, Ōmura Sumitada, was so receptive to the teachings of Christianity that he converted in 1563, making him the first Christian daimyo. The Portuguese landed at Yokoseura in 1562 and 1563.  In November 1563, Ōmura vassals who were incensed at his conversion to Christianity rebelled and Yokoseura was burned down during the chaos. The Portuguese returned to Hirado the next year despite Jesuit warnings. There, Matsura Takanobu allegedly started a fire that burned a substantial part of the Portuguese goods. It was clear that the Portuguese could not safely conduct their trade in Hirado.

Battle
In 1565, the Captain-major João Pereira brought the carrack to the port of Yokoseura with the intention of going to trade in Hirado. He was dissuaded from doing so by the Jesuits in Yokoseura, and was persuaded to head to another Ōmura anchorage at the bay of Fukuda, within present-day Nagasaki, accompanied by a small galleon belonging to Diogo de Meneses, the captain of Malacca. Deprived of his potential pickings, Matsura Takanobu sought to punish the Portuguese for switching ports and conspired with Sakai merchants who came all the way to Hirado for naught. Matsura promised to divide the booty with the Sakai merchants in return for the loan of eight to ten of their large junks, and attached up to sixty smaller Japanese boats to form a flotilla carrying several hundred samurai to sail to Fukuda. The Jesuit fathers in Hirado sent warnings to Pereira when they realized what Takanobu was doing, but Pereira dismissed the threat. He was hence surprised when he saw the Hirado flotilla approach from the horizon.

The flotilla attacked the carrack in the morning of 18 October, when most of the crew was on the shore and could not return to the ship in time. This left only about 80 Europeans on the flagship, along with an uncounted number of black slaves and Chinese merchants taking refuge on board. The Japanese boats focused on boarding the larger carrack, and at one point climbed aboard from the stern and shot a musket at Pereira, denting his helmet. The Japanese then made their way into the great cabin, briefly holding the captain-major hostage and carrying off his writing desk before being repelled. The flotilla's focus on the carrack left it exposed to the Portuguese galleon, which was able to support the carrack by catching the Japanese flotilla in the two ships' crossfire. The cannons wrought such havoc on the frail Japanese boats that the Hirado forces, after losing 3 ships and over 70 men, in addition to over 200 wounded, withdrew to their base crestfallen. The battle lasted two hours. The victorious carrack, suffering only 8 lives lost, set sail for Macao at the end of November.

Aftermath
The Jesuits in Hirado wrote jubilantly of the Portuguese victory, which increased the prestige of the Portuguese in the eyes of the Japanese, "for the Japanese had hitherto only known us as merchants, and rated us no better than the Chinese". The Japanese also came to respect the superiority of Western gunpowder weapons. The Portuguese continued to call at Fukuda and the nearby Kuchinotsu for a few more years, but they felt the terrains of these ports were lacking and kept searching until Ōmura Sumitada offered the Jesuits the nearby port of Nagasaki, a mere fishing village at the time that the Portuguese found to be perfect. From 1571 onward the Portuguese traders focused their activities on Nagasaki, turning it into the hub of Japan's foreign trade and its window to the West until the 19th century.

See also
 Siege of Moji (1561) – the Portuguese carrack joins a Japanese battle in what became the first European naval bombardment on Japanese soil
 Battle of Manila (1574) - A Chinese and Japanese pirate fleet attacked Manila with the goal to capture the city
 Battle of Cagayan (1582) – A fleet of Asian pirates led by Japanese attack and are defeated by a Spanish flotilla
 Nossa Senhora da Graça incident (1610) – A Japanese flotilla attacks a Portuguese carrack that ends in the latter's sinking
 Second Attack on Kamaishi (9 August 1945) – last ever direct naval bombardment of the Japanese home islands in World War II

Notes

References
 
 
 
 
 
 

1565 in Japan
1565 in the Portuguese Empire
Japan–Portugal relations
History of Nagasaki
Fukuda Bay 1565
Fukuda Bay 1565
Fukuda Bay 1565
Matsura clan
Fukuda Bay